Gran Teatro de La Habana is a theater in Havana, Cuba, home to the Cuban National Ballet. It was designed by the Belgian architect Paul Belau and built by Purdy and Henderson, Engineers in 1914 at the site of the former Teatro Tacón. Its construction was paid for by the Galician immigrants of Havana to serve as a community-social center. Located in the Paseo del Prado, its facilities include theatres, a concert hall, conference rooms, a video screening room, as well as an art gallery, a choral center and several rehearsal halls for dance companies. It hosts the International Ballet Festival of Havana every two years since 1960.

History

Since its inception in 1838, Teatro Tacón had occupied the north-western part of the site bounded by Paseo del Prado and Calle Consulado and Calles San Rafael and San José.  Its auditorium hosted such European artists as Enrico Caruso and Sarah Bernhardt. During the first years of Cuban independence when thousands of immigrants arrived in Cuba from Spain, a new building addition was constructed around the concert hall of Teatro Tacón. Originally known as the Centro Gallego de La Habana, the building is decorated with sculptures by Giuseppe Moretti representing benevolence, education, music and theatre.

Currently, the principal venue is the García Lorca Auditorium, with seats for 1,500 persons, it provides a home for the Cuban National Ballet Company, and for other dance companies and musical performances. During the 19th and 20th century, performances that took place on its stage include: Ole Bull, Enrico Caruso, Fanny Elssler, Jenny Lind, Anna Pavlova, Antonia Mercé, Ruth Saint Denis, Ted Shawn, Teresa Carreño, Vicente Escudero, Maya Plisetskaya, Clorinda Corradi, Sarah Bernhardt, Carla Fracci and Alicia Alonso, as well as companies such as the American Ballet Theatre, the Royal Winnipeg Ballet, Antonio Gades ballet, the Ballet of the Colón Theatre of Buenos Aires, the Ballet Folclórico of Mexico, plus other ballet companies.

Architecture

The Centro Gallego a Baroque Revival building, was built around the old concert hall of the Teatro Tacón located at the corner of Calles of San Rafael and Consulado. Architect Paul Belau, architect of the Presidential Palace, and the U.S. firm Purdy and Henderson, Engineers, kept the original theatre and built the Centro Gallego, a Baroque Revival style building addition that enlarged the support functions of the concert hall and introduced an elaborate system of circulation. The exterior of the original Teatro Tacón received a new stone facing to harmonize with the new exterior of the Centro Gallego.

Sculpture

There is a group of four sculptures in white marble, part of a group of ninety-seven, by Giuseppe Moretti and Geneva Mercer representing charity, education, music and theater.

A bronze sculpture was revealed in 2018 by the Cuban sculptor José Villa Soberón, a sculpture of Alicia Alonso in the lobby of the Gran Teatro. The sculpture is named Giselle after the romantic ballet that brought the legendary dancer to world fame. Giselle premiered in 1841 at the Paris Opera and is one of the main titles within the repertoire of the National Ballet of Cuba. It is therefore no coincidence that the artist chose this classic to represent the figure.

Performance
During the 19th and 20th century, performances that took place on its stage include: Ole Bull, Enrico Caruso, Fanny Elssler, Jenny Lind, Anna Pavlova, Antonia Mercé, Ruth Saint Denis, Ted Shawn, Teresa Carreño, Vicente Escudero, Maya Plisetskaya, Clorinda Corradi, Sarah Bernhardt, Carla Fracci and Alicia Alonso, as well as companies such as the American Ballet Theatre, the Royal Winnipeg Ballet, Antonio Gades ballet, the Ballet of the Colón Theatre of Buenos Aires, the Ballet Folclórico of Mexico, plus other ballet companies. The principal venue is the García Lorca Auditorium, with seats for 1,500 persons, provides a home for the Cuban National Ballet Company, and for other dance companies and musical venues.

See also 

List of buildings in Havana

Notes

References

Bibliography

Gallery

External links
 El Gran Teatro de La Habana es una de las más importantes instituciones culturales de América Latina.
 
 The Great Theatre of Havana at the National Ballet of Cuba homepage

See also

Purdy and Henderson, Engineers
Teatro Tacón

Theatres in Havana
Architecture in Cuba
Spanish Colonial architecture in Cuba
Neoclassical architecture in Cuba
Concert halls in Cuba
Opera houses in Cuba
Theatres completed in 1915
1910s establishments in Cuba
20th-century architecture in Cuba